The Belgian Red (known in Dutch as Rood West-Vlaams and in French as Rouge de Flandre occidentale , literally "Red West-Flemish") is a cattle breed from Flanders in Belgium and Northern France. It is considered in danger of extinction.

Characteristics 
Belgian Reds are primarily solid red with potentially a few white patches on head, dewlap, underline and legs, and udder or scrotum.  They are generally long, large and heavy animals.

This breed is primarily a dual purpose breed, being raised for both meat and milk. However, after 1980's selection for two separate strains (meat and milk or dual-purpose) were created by the breeders of this breed.

 Bulls generally weigh 1,200 kg (~2200 lb) and are 153 cm (5 ft) tall at shoulder
 Cow generally weigh 700 kg (~1500 lb) and are 138 cm (4.5 ft) tall at shoulder

Performance 
The milk performance of cows in 2004 was about 5,000 kg milk with 4.27% milk fat content and 3.43% protein.

History and extension 
The breed's original region is Flanders of France and West Flanders of Belgium. In the 19th century the new breed was developed out of the local breeds, Cassel and Veurne-Ambacht of the region. These original breeds nearly came into extinction during World War I in Belgium. After the war, the breeders came together in cooperation to form a new breed. In 1920 the first stud book was introduced. 

In 1986 there were still about 50,000 Belgian Red cattle left in the region, but the population decreased rapidly. In 2001 there were recorded to be less than 100 of the cattle left in the world.

External links
 EAAP Animal genetic data bank 
 Oklahoma State University breed description
 Dutch text and photograph

Cattle breeds
Cattle breeds originating in Belgium

Red cattle